Hassane/Hassan Abdou (born 10 February 1973) is a Comoros male athlete, who competed at the 1996 Summer Olympic Games in the Men's 400m he finished 8th in his heat and failed to advance.

References

External links

Athletes (track and field) at the 1996 Summer Olympics
Olympic athletes of the Comoros
1973 births
Comorian male sprinters
Living people
Place of birth missing (living people)